Chitrada is a Gram panchayat in Mayurbhanj district, Orissa, India. The village is  large. It is located 25 km far from Baripada, the headquarters of Mayurbhanj district.
Chitrada is well known for its flora and fauna and for its rich cultural heritage. Chitrada is the birthplace of Mayurbhanj Style of Chhau Dance. Chitrada village is a center place of education in this region.

Educational Institute in Chitrada 
1. Chitrada college, Chitrada.

2. Jawahar Vidyapitha , Chitrada ( High School )

3. Chitrada Girls High School, Chitrada

4. SSB Regional Institute of Science & Technology, Chitrada, 
Mayurbhanj

References

Villages in Mayurbhanj district